Donebach is a neighborhood of the village of Mudau, Odenwald, Germany and has 369 inhabitants. At Donebach, there is the longwave transmitter of Deutschlandfunk for broadcasting on 153 kHz, whose antenna masts are with a height of 363 metres the second tallest structure of Germany.

Geography of Baden-Württemberg
Radio in Germany